Verónica Raquel Pérez Murillo (born 18 May 1988) is an American-born Mexican footballer who plays as an attacking midfielder for Liga MX Femenil club Atlas F.C. (women). She was a member of the Mexico women's national team. Between 2009 and 2016 she also played in professional leagues in the United States, Europe, and Australia.

Perez retired from international football in 2017 after the newly created Liga MX Femenil restricted eligibility to compete to only Mexico-born players. Two years later, when the Mexican Football Federation allowed to the foreign-born Mexican players, she joined Club Tijuana.

Early life
Her parents are Bernardo Pérez and Irene Murillo. She holds dual citizenship in the United States and Mexico.  Perez attended Crystal Springs Uplands School where she played one year of soccer, earning first team, All-League honors.  During her Freshman, Sophomore and Junior years she played for PSV Union FC and in her junior and senior years, she played for the club team, Pleasonton Rage, and represented the Far West region Olympic Development (ODP) team at the 2005 U.S. Youth Soccer Adidas Cup.

University of Washington
Pérez played for the University of Washington Huskies and was twice named to the All-Pac-10 second team. Pérez left the University of Washington ranked in the all-time top-10 in several categories, including third in shots (194) and games played (83), fourth in game-winning goals (8), tied for sixth in goals (21) and eighth in points (53).

Club career

Perez was selected as the 37th pick overall in the  Women's Professional Soccer (WPS) draft by the Saint Louis Athletica in 2010. After the WPS folded, Perez began training again with the  Mexico women's national football team.

Perez played for the Seattle Sounders Women during the 2009 and 2012 seasons and was a leading scorer.

During the summer of 2012, Pérez and her Sounders teammate and fellow University of Washington alum, Kate Deines, played for Stjarnan in Iceland's top division. The team won the Icelandic Women's Cup after a 1–0 win over Valur.

On 11 January 2013, Perez joined the Western New York Flash as part of the NWSL Player Allocation for the inaugural season of the National Women's Soccer League.

3 March 2014, Western New York Flash traded Perez and a 2015 fourth-round draft pick to the Washington Spirit in exchange for a 2014 and 2015 international roster spot. After she did not receive allocation status for the 2016 seasons, her NWSL rights were acquired by Seattle Reign FC in March 2016.

Pérez joined Swedish top division club KIF Örebro DFF in January 2016.

In 2018, Perez played for OSA FC in the Women's Premier Soccer League. She moved to PacNW Women the next year.

International career
Perez played for both the Mexico women's national football team and the United States women's national under-23 soccer team during the Summer of 2009. On 5 November 2010, she scored the winning goal for Mexico in the CONCACAF Women's World Cup Qualifying game against the United States. In mid-2011, Pérez represented Mexico in the 2011 FIFA Women's World Cup in Germany. In October of that year, she led the Mexico to a third-place finish in the 2011 Pan American Games. Perez retired from international duty after the Liga MX Femenil restricted play to only Mexico-born players.

Coaching career
Perez is an assistant coach for her former club, PSV Union FC.

See also

 List of Mexican Fútbol (soccer) athletes
 List of 2011 Pan American Games medal winners
 List of University of Washington people

References

External links

 
 
 Profile at Mexican Football Federation 
 
 Saint Louis Athletica player profile
 Washington player profile
 Seattle Sounders Women player profile
 Western New York Flash player profile
 
 

1988 births
Living people
Citizens of Mexico through descent
Mexican women's footballers
Women's association football midfielders
Verónica Pérez
Canberra United FC players
KIF Örebro DFF players
Club Tijuana (women) footballers
Club América (women) footballers
Verónica Pérez
A-League Women players
Damallsvenskan players
Liga MX Femenil players
Mexico women's international footballers
2011 FIFA Women's World Cup players
2015 FIFA Women's World Cup players
Footballers at the 2011 Pan American Games
Medalists at the 2011 Pan American Games
Pan American Games bronze medalists for Mexico
Pan American Games medalists in football
Mexican expatriate women's footballers
Mexican expatriate sportspeople in Iceland
Expatriate women's footballers in Iceland
Mexican expatriate sportspeople in Australia
Expatriate women's soccer players in Australia
Mexican expatriate sportspeople in Sweden
Expatriate women's footballers in Sweden
LGBT association football players
Mexican LGBT sportspeople
American women's soccer players
Soccer players from California
Sportspeople from Hayward, California
American sportspeople of Mexican descent
Washington Huskies women's soccer players
USL W-League (1995–2015) players
Seattle Sounders Women players
Women's Professional Soccer players
Saint Louis Athletica players
National Women's Soccer League players
Western New York Flash players
Washington Spirit players
Women's Premier Soccer League players
American expatriate women's soccer players
American expatriate sportspeople in Iceland
American expatriate sportspeople in Australia
American expatriate sportspeople in Sweden
LGBT people from California
American LGBT sportspeople